Fight Master: Bellator MMA was a mixed martial arts based reality television series.  It centered on the promotion Bellator Fighting Championships and aired on Spike TV. The series debuted on June 19, 2013.

Background

The series was officially announced by Bellator and Spike TV at a press conference on February 5, 2013.  The coaches and trainers for the series, which will feature 32 welterweight fighters, will be Randy Couture, Frank Shamrock, Greg Jackson, and Joe Warren.  The 32 fighters will be competing for a spot in Bellator's welterweight tournament.  The weekly series will culminate in a live season finale on Spike TV with the winner advancing into the fall welterweight tournament.  It debuted on Spike TV on June 19, 2013.

The first seven shows aired on Wednesday nights at 10pm.  However, due to declining ratings, Spike opted to move the show's final three episodes to Thursday at 11pm to follow Total Nonstop Action Wrestling.

Cast

Coaches
Randy Couture, head coach of black team
Frank Shamrock, head coach of green team
Greg Jackson, head coach of red team
Joe Warren, head coach of blue team

Fighters

Team Jackson 
Tim Welch, Eric Bradley, Bryan Travers, Joe Riggs
Team Couture  
AJ Matthews, Cole Williams, Cristiano Souza, Mike Bronzoulis

Team Shamrock 
Nick Barnes, Chris Lozano, Mike Dubois, Joe Williams
Team Warren 
Eric Scallan, Evan Cutts, Jason Norwood, Ismael Gonzalez

 Fighters eliminated during the entry round
Chip Pollard, Christopher Curtis, Brendan Tierney, Darryl Cobb, Josh Quayhagen, Rob Mills, Tom Gallicchio, Brett Nakamura, Joe Williams, Steve Montgomery, Jacob Ortiz, Marcus Aurelio, Dom O'Grady, Artenas Young, Gareth Joseph, Frank Carrillo (due to injury; replaced by Rob Mills), Andy Uhrich (due to injury; replaced by Joe Williams)

Episodes
Episode 1: "Fight to Choose" (June 19, 2013)
An introduction video explained the Fight Master concept where fighters are allowed to pick their own coaches.
The introduction of the four coaches, Randy Couture, Frank Shamrock, Greg Jackson and Joe Warren.
The first five preliminary fights were shown:

Tim Welch defeated Chip Pollard via KO (punch) in the first round.
Welch chose Jackson as his coach.
Eric Scallan defeated Christopher Curtis by unanimous decision after two rounds.
Scallan chose Warren as his coach.
Nick Barnes defeated Brendan Tierney via submission (rear naked choke) in the first round.
Barnes chose Shamrock as his coach.
AJ Matthews defeated Darryl Cobb by unanimous decision after three rounds.
Matthews chose Couture as his coach.
Chris Lozano defeated Josh Quayhagen by unanimous decision after two rounds.
Lozano chose Shamrock as his coach.

Episode 2: "Which Camp Do You Choose?" (June 26, 2013)
The elimination round continued with six more fights:

Mike Dubois defeated Rob Mills via submission (guillotine choke) in the first round.
Dubois chose Shamrock as his coach.
Eric Bradley defeated Tom Gallicchio by unanimous decision after two rounds.
Bradley chose Jackson as his coach.
Evan Cutts defeated Brett Nakamura via submission (rear naked choke) in first round.
Cutts chose Joe Warren as his coach.
Cole Williams defeated Joe Williams by unanimous decision after three rounds.
Williams chose Couture as his coach.
Jason Norwood defeated Jacob Ortiz by unanimous decision after two rounds.
Norwood chose Warren as his coach.
Cristiano Souza defeated Steve Montgomery by KO (punches) in the first round.
Souza chose Couture as his coach.

Episode 3: "Last Shot for Spot" (July 10, 2013)
The elimination round continued with the final five fights:

Ismael Gonzalez defeated Marcus Aurelio via TKO (liver kick & punches) in the first round.
Gonzalez chose Warren as his coach.
Andy Uhrich defeated Dom O'Grady by unanimous decision after two rounds.
Due to a cut over his eye, Uhrich was disqualified from the competition.
Bryan Travers defeated Artenas Young by unanimous decision after three rounds.
Travers chose Jackson as his coach.
Mike Bronzoulis defeated Gareth Joseph by unanimous decision after two rounds.
Bronzoulis chose Couture as his coach.

The final fight was scheduled to be Frank Carrillo against Joe Riggs.  However, Carrillo injured his left shoulder while warming up and was unable to fight.  With the approval of the athletic commission, Mills was allowed to re-enter the tournament.

Joe Riggs defeated Rob Mills by submission (heel hook) in the first round.
Riggs chose Jackson as his coach.

Episode 4: "Training Day" (July 17, 2013)
The 15 advancing fighters move into the house and start training with the coaches.
Due to being one fighter short, Shamrock is allowed to bring back a fighter who lost; he chose Joe Williams.
The coaches rank the fighters in order of 1 through 16 and the fighters are randomly chosen in order to pick their fights
Two elimination fights were held.
Cole Williams defeated Mike Dubois by submission (rear naked choke) in the first round.
Chris Lozano defeated Bryan Travers by split decision after three rounds.

Episode 5: "Strikers and Wrestlers" (July 24, 2013)
Two more elimination fights were held.
Norwood chose Bronzoulis to be his opponent.
Mike Bronzoulis defeated Jason Norwood by KO (punches) in the third round.
Gonzalez chose Joe Williams to be his opponent.
Joe Williams defeated Ismael Gonzalez by submission (arm-triangle choke) in the second round.

Episode 6: "Old School, New School" (July 31, 2013)
Two more elimination fights were held.
Welch chose Barnes to be his opponent.
Nick Barnes defeated Tim Welch by submission (rear naked choke) in the first round.
Top seed Riggs chose Scallan to be his opponent.
Joe Riggs defeated Eric Scallan by unanimous decision after two rounds.

Episode 7: "Who is the Underdog Now?" (August 7, 2013)
The final two elimination fights were held.
Souza chose Cutts to be his opponent.
Evan Cutts defeated Cristiano Souza by submission (triangle choke) in the second round.
Matthews chose Bradley to be his opponent.
Eric Bradley defeated A.J. Matthews by unanimous decision after two rounds.

Episode 8: "Friend or Foe?" (August 15, 2013)
The coaches rank the remaining fighters; Joe Riggs is once again the top seed.
Cole Williams chose Barnes to be his opponent.
Cole Willams defeated Nick Barnes by TKO (punches) in the first round.
Bellator fighter Muhammed "King Mo" Lawal shows up to watch the next match.
Lozano chose Bronzoulis to be his opponent.
Mike Bronzoulis defeated Chris Lozano by unanimous decision after three rounds.

Episode 9: "Eyes on the Prize" (August 22, 2013)
The last two quarterfinal matches are held.
Bradley chose Joe Williams to be his opponent.
This was a match between two former collegians as Bradley wrestled for the Penn State Nittany Lions, while Williams wrestled for the Michigan State Spartans.
Eric Bradley defeated Joe Williams by unanimous decision after two rounds.
With Williams' loss, Team Shamrock has been eliminated from the tournament.
Riggs chose Cutts to be his opponent.
Joe Riggs defeated Evan Cutts by unanimous decision after two rounds.
With Cutts' loss, Team Warren has been eliminated from the tournament.

Episode 10: "It All Comes Down to This" (August 29, 2013)
The final four fighters are ranked by the coaches with Cole Williams superseding Joe Riggs as the new top seed.
Williams chose Riggs to be his opponent.
Joe Riggs defeated Cole Williams by split decision after three rounds.
Bradley and Bronzoulis were the final two contestants.
Mike Bronzoulis defeated Eric Bradley via TKO (punches) in the second round.
The two finalists, Riggs and Bronzoulis, faced off in the cage with their coaches Jackson and Couture, respectively.

Coach selections

First round rankings

Second round rankings

Tournament Bracket

Finale

The finale between Joe Riggs and Mike Bronzoulis was expected to take place on September 7, 2013 at Bellator 98. However, on September 3, Riggs sustained a significant eye injury and the bout was postponed. The finale took place at Bellator 106 on November 2, 2013.

Welterweight bout:  Joe Riggs vs  Mike Bronzoulis
Joe Riggs defeated Mike Bronzoulis unanimous decision (30-27, 30-27, 30-27) after three rounds.

References

External links 
 

2013 American television series debuts
2013 American television series endings
2010s American reality television series
Bellator MMA
Mixed martial arts television shows
Spike (TV network) original programming